Bürsülüm (also, Barsalym, Bürsümlü, and Byursyulyum) is a village and municipality in the Lerik Rayon of Azerbaijan.  It has a population of 426.  The municipality consists of the villages of Bürsülüm and Ləkər.

References 

Populated places in Lerik District